was a waka poet and Japanese noblewoman active in the late-Heian and early-Kamakura period. She was a contributor to the Senzai Wakashū anthology.

Poetry 
One of her poems is included in the Ogura Hyakunin Isshu:

External links 
E-text of her poems (in Japanese)

1140s births
1217 deaths
Minamoto clan
12th-century Japanese poets
Japanese women poets
Hyakunin Isshu poets